Peter Wichers is a Swedish guitarist, songwriter and record producer best known as one of the founding members of melodic death metal band Soilwork.  From 1995 until late 2005, when he announced his departure from the band, and again from 2008 until 2012  he was the lead guitarist and songwriter, especially on their Stabbing the Drama album.

Rejoining
18 September 2008, it was announced that Wichers had rejoined Soilwork in his previous role. Having joined the band again, Wichers accompanied Soilwork on their European tour in late 2008 and the American tour in early 2009. Once the tour was finished, the band wrote and recorded The Panic Broadcast album.
On 25 June 2012 it was announced that Wichers left the band for the second time, due to creative differences.
Peter's official statement posted on the band's Facebook page is as follows:
 
After leaving Soilwork, he filled in for Adam Dutkiewicz when he was injured on Killswitch Engage's European tour.  Later he collaborated with singers from across the melodic death metal genre including Anders Fridén, former bandmate Björn "Speed" Strid and John Bush (Armored Saint and ex Anthrax) vocalist to make an album much in the same style as Roadrunner United, entitled Nuclear Blast All-Stars.  He also co-wrote Warrel Dane's solo record Praises to the War Machine.

Personal life
After his first split from Soilwork, Wichers moved from Los Angeles to Nashville, Tennessee where he worked as a producer and songwriter.  Wichers currently lives in North Carolina with his wife, Sara Wichers (who is from North Carolina) with the couple's son. Wichers met Sara in Spain while touring for Soilwork.
Wichers works for Jackson Guitars since 2015.

Discography
Soilwork
In Dreams We Fall into the Eternal Lake (1997 demo)
Steelbath Suicide (1998)
The Chainheart Machine (2000)
A Predator's Portrait (2001)
Natural Born Chaos (2002)
Figure Number Five (2003)
The Early Chapters (2003 EP)
Stabbing the Drama (2005)
The Panic Broadcast (2010)

Warrel Dane
Praises to the War Machine (2008)

Contributions
Nuclear Blast All-Stars: Out of the Dark (2007)

Producer
All That Remains - The Fall of Ideals (2006) (guitar production/engineer)
Nuclear Blast All-Stars: Out of the Dark (2006) (guitar, bass, producer/engineer)
Samadhi - Incandescence (2007)
Warrel Dane - Praises to the War Machine (2008) (guitar, bass, producer/engineer)
Mannah - Untitled (2008) (producer/engineer)
Nevermore - The Obsidian Conspiracy (2010) (producer/engineer)
Remain - Untitled (2010) (producer/engineer, mix)
Soilwork - The Panic Broadcast (2010) (producer/engineer)
Darkest Hour - The Human Romance (2011)
James LaBrie - Impermanent Resonance (2013) (Co-Producer / Additional songwriting - guitars)

References

External links
Soilwork official band website

Living people
Swedish heavy metal bass guitarists
1979 births
People from Ängelholm Municipality
21st-century bass guitarists
Soilwork members
Swedish record producers
Heavy metal producers
Swedish songwriters